Volenteershoek Pass, in Eastern Cape, South Africa, is on the road between Rhodes and Tiffindell Ski Resort.

The village of Rhodes has had a colorful history dating back to the 1880s, and there are several Victorian buildings throughout the village, which has been designated a Conservation Area by the Ministry of the Environment. As a result of its proximity to Tiffindell Ski Resort during the winter months, the town has become renowned for its fly-fishing during the summer months as well.

There are a number of scenic and steep roads on the way from Rhodes to Tiffindell. There is no need to use 4x4, but you do need to use controlled power, especially where the cement strips make their way up some of the most extreme sections. On the way to Tiffindell Ski Resort you will pass under the highest point in the Cape (3.001m above sea level) as you approach the resort. The Europeans named this peak Ben McDhui after the mountain in Scotland, and the locals affectionately refer to it as BenMac by the local tribes. Local tribes refer to this peak by its indigenous name, Makhollo (Great Mother).

Mountain passes of the Eastern Cape